Cycloptilum trigonipalpum, the forest scaly cricket, is a species of scaly cricket in the family Mogoplistidae. It is found in North America.

References

Crickets
Articles created by Qbugbot
Insects described in 1912